Forrest Avery Carney, better known as Mr.Kitty or Echo Strobe, (born March 24, 1992) is a producer, singer and DJ from Arlington, Texas. His style is described as being synthwave, synthpop, new wave, witch house and dark wave and has been said to awaken a nostalgic feeling in the listener. He is best known for his song "After Dark", which was released in 2014 and went viral after a fan video was published on YouTube in 2019.

Carney has done remixes for IAMX, and Aesthetic Perfection among others, and co-produced songs with Pastel Ghost and Crystal Castles.

Career 

In 2008 he began releasing RMX, the first in a series of mini-albums featuring remixes by various artists. The following year he released RMX II and in 2010 his first standalone LP Until Death Do Us Part, an album that included a first version of "Everything Will Be Okay", a song that would be remixed and edited in the future. In the same year he released RMX III and in 2011 RMX IV and D E Δ T H, his second studio album containing the songs "††" and "Resurrectionincluded". This was the first album to feature a cat's face on the cover, an element that would be repeated on his next three studio recordings. In 2012, Mr.Kitty released 3 albums: RMX V, RMX VI (last album of the RMX saga) and his third studio album and first under a record label (Keep It Dark Records), Eternity, which featured the song "Destroy Me", one of his first hits.

From 2012 he started collaborating with remixes on various songs and studio albums. In 2013, Life, his fourth studio album, was released under the Engraved Ritual label, featuring the song "Insects". In 2014, he achieved underground success with Time, under the Juggernaut Music Group label, and most notably with the songs "After Dark" and "XIII". In 2015, Fragments was released under the Negative Gain Productions label. The following year he appeared as the remixer of North Star for the IAMX and LAX (Mr.Kitty Remix) album Everything Is Burning (Metanoia Addendum) for Aesthetic Perfection and also released a four-song mini-album compilation featuring a remix of "Everything Will Be Okay". In 2017, Mr.Kitty released AI under the Negative Gain Productions label.

Throughout 2018, Mr.Kitty focused on various collaborations and in 2019 released the album Ephemeral independently.

To this day, Carney produces in his apartment, on a computer he has used since he was 18.

His album Ephemeral came about after the death of a friend, as for him "it's the only way to express feelings."

Controversies 
A teenager from Russia told The Austin Chronicle that synthpop artist Mr.Kitty sent him nude photos, sexual videos and intimate messages via direct messages on a social media platform over a period of more than 4 months. The victim also testified that he was 15 at the time and had told the singer that. On June 26, 2021, Mr. Kitty then released a statement via Twitter, Instagram and Facebook, admitting to having had an online relationship with an (unbeknownst to him) underage fan and apologizing to the fan and his current partner.

Lyrical content 
Carney mostly deals with sad themes in his songs, such as loss, depression and death. He usually relies on cross themes or exit rhymes.

Discography

Studio Albums  
 2010: Until Death Do Us Part (Self Release)
 2011: D E Δ T H (Self Release)
 2012: Eternity (Keep it Dark Records)
 2013: Life (Engraved Ritual)
 2014: Time (Juggernaut Music Group)
 2015: Fragments (Negative Gain Production)
 2017: A.I. (Negative Gain Production)
 2019: Ephemeral (Self Release)

EPs and Singles 
 2008: Survive (Self Release)
 2008: Forever Nintendo mit Eric Chiptune (CalmDownKidder Records)
 2010: Scars EP mit Tyler Tripp (Self Release)
 2012: Emotional / Physical (Aural Secrets, Moon Sounds Records)
 2012: My Favorite Ghost (Invisibles)
 2012: Covers (Self Release)
 2012: Uncarresed (Invisibles)
 2014: Insects (Moon Sounds Records)
 2014: XIII (Juggernaut Music Group)
 2015: Entwine (Negative Gain Production)
 2015: No Prisoners mit Corroded Master (Corroded Master Self Release)
 2016: I Hope You Fall Apart (Negative Gain Productions)
 2019: Not Dead Yet (Self Release)
 2020: Bubble (Mr.Kitty Remix) (Released von Danny Blu)
 2021: La Nuit Sexuelle (Mr.Kitty Remix) (Daaganda Records)
 2021: The Stranglings (Mr.Kitty Remix) (Les Disques Records)
 2021: The House of the Dead (mit NADA5150) (Naysayers404)
 2023: 6x6 (Positive Loss Recordings)

Remix albums 
 2008: R.M.X (Self Release)
 2009: R.M.X II (Self Release)
 2010: R.M.X III (Self Release)
 2011: R.M.X IV (Self Release)
 2012: R.M.X V (Self Release)
 2012: R.M.X VI (Self Release)

Compilations 
 2013: Mr.Kitty (Beinhaltet all seine gesammelten Werke bis 2013 – zurückreichend bis 2005)
 2014: 2014 SXSW Sampler
 2015: Mr.Kitty
 2016: -+

DJ Mixes 
 2014: Ultra Cute Death (Cultwave Radio) ist ein 61:26 Mix, den er für Cultwave Radio aufgenommen hat.

Music Videos 
 2011: Destroy Me
 2013: Detach
 2014: Insects
 2015: In Your Blood
 2016: Fragments
 2017: Habits (feat. PASTEL GHOST)
 2019: Not Dead Yet

External links 
 Mr.Kitty at Discogs
 Mr.Kitty at Bandcamp

References 

1992 births
Living people
People from Arlington, Texas
American synth-pop musicians
Synthwave musicians
Dark wave musicians
American electronic musicians